Bacao Rhythm & Steel Band is a German funk music ensemble founded by members of the Mighty Mocambos.

History
Bandleader Björn Wagner played in funk group The Mocambos and lived in Trinidad and Tobago for a time, where he studied steel drums and had one custom made. The group released its first 7" single, consisting of two covers of songs by The Meters, in 2007. Shortly after this they followed up with another 7" single, a cover of the 50 Cent hit "P.I.M.P.". Several more 7" records were released in the mid-2010s. Some of these singles were collected on the group's first full-length, 55, which was released by the Brooklyn label Big Crown in 2016. The album included several new originals as well as the cover of "P.I.M.P." and covers of John Holt's "Police in Helicopter", Dennis Coffey's "Scorpio", Faith Evans's "Love Like This", and Cat Stevens's "Was Dog a Doughnut".

Discography
Albums
55 (Big Crown, 2016)
The Serpent's Mouth (Big Crown, 2018)
Expansions (Big Crown, July 16, 2021)

Singles
"Look-Ka-Py-Py"/"Ease Back" (Mocambo, 2007)
"PIMP" (Mocambo, 2008)
"Bacao Suave" (Plane Jane, 2014)
"Jungle Fever" (Plane Jane, 2015)
"Love Like This" (Big Crown, 2016)
"Scorpio"/"8th Wonder" (Big Crown, 2016)

References

German funk musical groups